Platyla microspira is a species of very small land snail with an operculum, a terrestrial gastropod mollusk or micromollusk in the family Aciculidae. This species is found in Italy and Romania.

References

Platyla
Gastropods described in 1884
Molluscs of Europe
Taxonomy articles created by Polbot